Senator Davidson may refer to:

Alexander C. Davidson (1826–1897), Alabama State Senate
Andrew Davidson (soldier) (1840–1902), New York State Senate
Asbury Bascom Davidson (1855–1920), Texas State Senate
James Davidson (Kentucky politician) (died 1860), Kentucky State Senate
John S. Davidson (1846–1894), Georgia State Senate
John Davidson (Illinois politician) (1924–2012), Illinois State Senate
Robert H. M. Davidson (1832–1908), Florida State Senate
Thomas Whitfield Davidson (1876–1974), Texas State Senate
William Davidson (Pennsylvania representative) (1783–1867), Pennsylvania State Senate

See also
Joseph Davison (1868–1948), Northern Irish Senate